North Carolina's 3rd congressional district is located on the Atlantic coast of North Carolina. It covers the Outer Banks and the counties adjacent to the Pamlico Sound.

The district is currently represented by Greg Murphy following a special election after the seat was left vacant following the passing of Walter B. Jones Jr. in February 2019. Jones had been the district's representative from 1995 until his death.  In 2008, he defeated Democrat Craig Weber for reelection, and was challenged in 2010 by former chair of the Pitt County Democratic Party Johnny Rouse, whom he defeated by a vote of 72% to 26% (141,978 votes to 50,600).  In 2012, he was challenged by Frank Palombo, the former New Bern Police Chief, for the Republican Party nomination. The winner of the Republican primary then faced Marine Corps Veteran Erik Anderson in the general election.

A special election to fill the vacancy caused by Jones's death was held on September 10, 2019.  State representative Greg Murphy won the election.

On February 23, 2022, the North Carolina Supreme Court approved a new map which changed the 3rd district boundaries to include Duplin and Sampson Counties and part of Wayne County while removing Chowan, Greene, Pasquotank, Perquimans and Tyrrell Counties

Counties 
Counties in the 2023-2025 district map.
 Beaufort County
 Camden County
 Carteret County
 Craven County
 Currituck County
 Dare County
 Duplin County
 Hyde County
 Jones County
 Lenoir County
 Onslow County
 Pamlico County
 Pitt County (part)
 Sampson County
 Wayne County (part)

List of members representing the district

Election results

2000

2002

2004

2006

2008

2010

2012

2014

2016

2018

2019 (Special Election)

2020

2022

See also

North Carolina's congressional districts
List of United States congressional districts

References

 Congressional Biographical Directory of the United States 1774–present
 Rouse for Congress, North Carolina election results - Politics - Decision 2010 - msnbc.com

03